Lentil soup is a soup with lentils as its main ingredient; it may be vegetarian or include meat, and may use brown, red, yellow, green or black lentils, with or without the husk. Dehulled yellow and red lentils disintegrate in cooking, making a thick soup. It is a staple food throughout Europe, Latin America and the Middle East.

History and literature
Lentils were unearthed in the Paleolithic and Mesolithic layers of Franchthi Cave in Greece (9,500 to 13,000 years ago), in the end-Mesolithic at Mureybet and Tell Abu Hureyra in Syria, and sites dating to 8000 BC in the area of Jericho. Aristophanes called it the "sweetest of delicacies." Remains of lentils were found in royal tombs in the Theban necropolis, dating to 2400 BCE. The Roman cookbook Apicius, compiled in the 1st century AD, includes a recipe for lentil soup with chestnuts.

Lentil soup is mentioned in the Bible: In Genesis 25:30-34, Esau is prepared to give up his birthright for a pot of fragrant red lentil soup being cooked by his brother, Jacob. In Jewish tradition, lentil soup has been served at times of mourning; the roundness of the lentil represents a complete cycle of life.

Varieties

Lentil soup may include vegetables such as carrots, potatoes, celery, parsley, tomato, pumpkin, ripe plantain and onion. Common flavorings are garlic, bay leaf, cumin, olive oil, and vinegar. It is sometimes garnished with croutons or chopped herbs or butter, olive oil, cream or yogurt. Indian lentil soup contains a variety of aromatic spices. In Iraqi and Levantine cuisine the soup is seasoned with turmeric and cumin and topped with toasted, thin vermicelli noodles called sha'iriyya (شعيرية), and served with a lemon for squeezing.  In the Middle East, the addition of lemon juice gives a pungent tang and cuts the heaviness of the dish. In Egypt and throughout the Middle East, the soup is commonly puréed before serving, and is traditionally consumed in the winter.

Nutrition
Lentil soup is recognized as highly nutritious, a good source of protein, dietary fiber, iron and potassium.

See also
 List of soups
 Dal, Indian lentil preparations
 Ezogelin soup, a Turkish lentil and wheat soup
 Gheymeh, an Iranian lentil stew with red meat served over rice
 Haleem, a soup with wheat, barley, lentils, and meat
 Pea soup

References

External links

 Lentil soup recipe on allrecipes.com

Soups
Lentil dishes
Legume dishes
Ancient Greek cuisine
Ancient dishes
World cuisine
Levantine cuisine
Egyptian cuisine